The 2019 Philadelphia mayoral election was held on November 5, 2019, to elect the mayor of Philadelphia, Pennsylvania. Incumbent mayor Jim Kenney, first elected in 2015, was running for reelection. Kenney was running on raising the minimum wage to $15 per hour, to maintain supervised injection sites and the city's soda tax, and to ensure the city's compliance with the Paris Climate Agreement.

Ciancaglini promised to end Philadelphia's status as a sanctuary city and to cancel plans to establish sites where people can safely inject heroin. No Republican has won a Philadelphia mayoral election since Bernard Samuel in 1947.

Kenney easily won in his bid for re-election to a second term. However, this was the first election since the nationally controversial 2003 election where the Republican nominee managed to carry a ward, with Ciancaglini carrying slightly fewer wards than 2003 GOP nominee Sam Katz. This is because despite an easy landslide victory, there was increased dissatisfaction with Kenney and his administration, which steadily continued months after the election.

Democratic primary

Candidates 
 Jim Kenney, Incumbent
 Alan Butkovitz, former Philadelphia City Controller
 Anthony H. Williams, Minority Whip of the Pennsylvania State Senate, candidate for mayor in 2015 and for governor in 2010.

Results

Republican primary

Candidates 

 Billy Ciancaglini, defense attorney

Results

General election

Results

References

2019 in Philadelphia
Philadelphia
Philadelphia
2019